Quai de la Rapée is a station of the Paris Métro, serving Line 5, located in the 12th arrondissement of Paris.

Location

The station is located above ground between Pont Morland road bridge and the Voie Mazas, above the Saint-Martin canal, overhanging one of the locks leading to the Seine. The metro line connects to the Gare d'Austerlitz metro station by crossing the Seine via the Viaduc d'Austerlitz after the track winds to the right around the Institut médico-légal de Paris (morgue) on a viaduct called the Viaduc du quai de la Rapée. Since the closure of the nearby Arsenal station in 1939, the Quai de la Rapée station also serves the Bassin de l'Arsenal. Gare de Lyon is about 600 meters to the southeast.

History
The station was opened in 1906, under the name Station Contrescarpe, the former name of the Boulevard de la Bastille. On 13 July 1906, Line 5 from the Place d'Italie crossed the Seine via the Viaduc d'Austerlitz to the station and temporarily became its terminus. From 1 August, in order to facilitate connections, the metro returned to Gare de Lyon station using a preserved service road. This operation lasted until 17 December 1906, on which the line was extended to the Lancry (Jacques Bonsergent from 1946) station. From the station, the tracks plunge abruptly into tunnels at either end and it was submerged during the historic flood of 1910. The station is named after the Sieur de la Rapée, commissioner of war under Louis XV.

In 2018, the station had 1,273,466 passengers access it, which placed it at the 288th position out of 302 metro stations.

Services for passengers

Access
The station has a single access from Place Mazas.

Station layout

Bus connections
The station is served by line 72 of the RATP Bus Network, and at short distance by lines 24, 57, 61, 63 and 91 of the RATP bus network and, at night, by lines N01, N02 and N31 of the Noctilien network.

Gallery

References

Roland, Gérard (2003). Stations de métro. D'Abbesses à Wagram. Éditions Bonneton.

Paris Métro stations in the 12th arrondissement of Paris
Railway stations in France opened in 1906